Harley Miller was an American set decorator. He was nominated an Academy Award in the category Best Art Direction for the film Flight for Freedom.

Selected filmography
 Flight for Freedom (1943)

References

External links

American set decorators
Year of birth missing
Possibly living people